Robert M. Leeds (October 10, 1920 – October 8, 2000) was an American film editor and television director.

Selected filmography
 Frisco Tornado (1950)
 Wells Fargo Gunmaster (1951)
 Silver City Bonanza (1951)
 Million Dollar Pursuit (1951)
 Return of the Beverly Hillbillies (1981)

References

Bibliography
  Len D. Martin. The Republic Pictures Checklist: Features, Serials, Cartoons, Short Subjects and Training Films of Republic Pictures Corporation, 1935-1959. McFarland, 1998.

External links

1920 births
2000 deaths
Film directors from New York City
American film editors